Minding the Monsters is a stage performance of comedian and ventriloquist Jeff Dunham. The show was taped in the Lucas Theater, Savannah, Georgia, USA on May 23 and 24, 2012. The DVD and Blu-Ray were released on October 9, 2012, within the United States.

Characters

 Achmed Jr - The estranged son of Achmed. Controlled Chaos was his first onscreen appearance.
 Walter - A grumpy old Vietnam war veteran with an attitude who frequently complains about his wife.
 Bubba J - In Jeff's own words, "Pretty much just white-trash trailer-park." He talks about NASCAR and his love of beer.
 Peanut - A purple woozle from Micronesia described by Walter as "a frickin' Muppet on crack." He wears one red Converse shoe on his left foot. In the first and second specials, he mocks José's accent, and his status on a stick, saying, "Maybe it was a horrible pogo accident. You know, doing-doing.... crriccck! Olé!"
 José Jalapeño on a Stick - a jalapeño pepper on a stick, or "steek" as he says it with a Hispanic accent.
 Little Jeff - A miniature east coast version of Jeff himself. He appeared in Jeff Dunham: Controlled Chaos as a puppet that Peanut used when trying to do ventriloquism like Jeff.
 Achmed the Dead Terrorist - The skeletal corpse of an incompetent suicide bomber, whom Dunham uses to satirize the contemporary issue of terrorism.

Certifications and sales

See also
 Jeff Dunham

References

External links 

2012 direct-to-video films
2012 films
American comedy films
Stand-up comedy on DVD
2012 comedy films
2010s English-language films
2010s American films